The Timber and Stone Act of 1878 in the United States sold Western timberland for $2.50 per acre ($618/km2) in 160 acre (0.6 km2) blocks.

Land that was deemed "unfit for farming" was sold to those who might want to "timber and stone" (logging and mining) upon the land. The act was used by speculators who were able to get great expanses declared "unfit for farming" allowing them to increase their land holdings at minimal expense.

In practice however, many wealthy companies and individuals seeking to access natural resources fraudulently circumvented the law by hiring individuals to purchase  lots that were then deeded to the company in direct violation of the law. In this way, more than 90 percent of the several million acres of timberland privatized under the Act in Washington, Oregon, Nevada and California were fraudulently compiled.

See also
Desert Land Act
Homestead Act

References

United States federal public land legislation
1878 in American law
1878 in the United States